Hyposmocoma laysanensis is a species of moth of the family Cosmopterigidae. It is endemic to Laysan. The type locality is Guano Rock.

The wingspan is 5.2–7.7 mm.

The larval case consists of a cone-shaped structure, which is 4.5–6.0 mm in length, small and thin and decorated with bits of sand, and probably guano, woven with silk filaments. The aperture is covered with an operculum and decorated with small pebbles, or sand grains fastened by silk. The background color ranges from off-white to gray.

Adults were reared from case-making larvae. Larvae were collected on rocks, sometimes disposed in a pile, on the island of Laysan. When disturbed, larvae were observed to tightly close the operculum of their case with their mandibles. The abundance of the cases suggests that the species is very common on Laysan.

External links
New species of Hyposmocoma (Lepidoptera, Cosmopterigidae) from the remote Northwestern Hawaiian Islands of Laysan, Necker, and Nihoa

laysanensis
Endemic moths of Hawaii
Moths described in 2009